Družstevná pri Hornáde is a village and municipality of the Košice-okolie District, located in the Kosice Region of eastern Slovakia.

Etymology 
The name is derived from "Jednotné roľnícke družstvo", which was a type of agricultural cooperative that was common during the Soviet era.

History
Družstevná pri Hornáde was originally 3 villages: Malá Vieska, Kostoľany nad Hornádom and Tepličany. They were combined into one administrative area during the Soviet era. Kostoľany nad Hornádom became an independent municipality in 2003.

Geography
The village lies at an altitude of 258 metres and covers an area of 16.466 km².
The municipality has a population of about 2,185 people. The River Hornád flows through the village.

Genealogical resources

The records for genealogical research are available at the state archive "Statny Archiv in Kosice, Slovakia"

See also
 List of municipalities and towns in Slovakia

External links

Surnames of living people in Druzstevna pri Hornade

Villages and municipalities in Košice-okolie District
Šariš